Franz Schubert (31 January 1797 – 19 November 1828), a Viennese composer of the late Classical to early Romantic eras, left a very extensive body of work notwithstanding his short life. He wrote over 1,500 items, or, when collections, cycles and variants are grouped, some thousand compositions. The largest group are his over six hundred Lieder for solo voice and piano. He composed nearly as many piano pieces, and further some 150 part songs, some 40 liturgical compositions (including several masses) and around 20 stage works like operas and incidental music. His orchestral output includes thirteen symphonies (seven completed) and several overtures. Schubert's chamber music includes over 20 string quartets, and several quintets, trios and duos.

Otto Erich Deutsch compiled the first comprehensive catalogue of Schubert's works and published it in 1951 as Schubert: Thematic Catalogue of all his Works in Chronological Order. A revised edition appeared in German in 1978. Later editions of the catalogue contained minor updates.

Publication of Schubert's compositions started during his lifetime, by opus number. After the composer's death, posthumous opus numbers continued to be assigned to new publications of his work until 1867 (Op. post. 173). Meanwhile, publications without opus number had also started. For instance, from shortly after the composer's death, the many songs in Diabelli's fifty  (installment from the heritage) editions.

There are two attempts to publish everything Schubert has composed in a single edition:
From 1965 Dover Publications started to reprint this edition, and later it was made available at the IMSLP website.
 The  (NSA), also known as the New Schubert Edition (NSE), is published by Bärenreiter (Kassel). Plans for this edition began as early as 1963, with the foundation of the International Schubert Society, headquartered at the University of Tübingen, Germany. 81 of the edition's projected 101 volumes were published by early May 2015, and it is scheduled to conclude in 2027.

Websites such as Schubert Online (schubert-online.at) provide facsimiles (scans) of Schubert's autographs and of other manuscripts and early editions of his work. Texts of Schubert's vocal music can be published without the music, for instance his Lieder (songs) at the LiederNet Archive website.



Works listed in the Deutsch catalogue
The 1951 first edition of the Deutsch catalogue attempted to list all dated works by Schubert in chronological order, assigning them a number from 1 to 965. Undated works were ordered in the range 966–992. Nos. 993–998 referred to manuscripts that had resurfaced shortly before the catalogue was printed.

Later versions of the catalogue adhered to the general principles that Deutsch numbers below 966 referred, in a chronological order, to compositions by Schubert with an established time of composition, and that the range 966–992 was reserved for his compositions with an uncertain date of composition. Thus "Die Taubenpost", the last Lied Schubert composed, was reassigned from D 957 No. 14 to D 965A, and D 993, an early piano composition, to D 2E.

Spurious and doubtful works (Anh. I) Annex I of the first edition of the catalogue contains only a single composition under the header Spurious and doubtful works, but however also points to some compositions with authentication issues elsewhere in the catalogue. The 1978 edition of the catalogue lists 32 spurious and doubtful works in its first Anhang (annex), including some that were for that reason removed from the main catalogue.

Arrangements by Schubert (Anh. II) The 1978 version of the catalogue lists 4 arrangements by Schubert in its second Anhang

Works of others composers copied by Schubert (Anh. III) Annex II in the first edition of the catalogue contains compositions by other composers copied by Schubert. In the 1978 edition the list was expanded and became Anhang III.

"Setting" vs. "version" distinction  the New Schubert Edition distinguishes between Bearbeitung (setting) and Fassung (version), the first meaning an independent composition, the second stages of the same composition (modifications of essentially the same composition). Usually different settings have different D numbers, while versions are grouped under the same D number, unless when set for a different (group of) performer(s). The first edition of the Deutsch catalogue was less strict on that point, leading to Deutsch number reassignments in later publications. Example:  is described as two settings of the same text in the original catalogue, the second having become "D deest" by the time it was published in Series IV, Volume 8 of the New Schubert Edition (while the music has no resemblance to the earlier setting).

Legend

Table

|- id="1–1C" style="text-align: center; background: #D8D8D8;"
| data-sort-value="000.9" colspan="2" | 1–1C
| data-sort-value="ZZZZZ1810" colspan="5" |

| data-sort-value="1809-12-31" | 1810
| data-sort-value="ZZZZZ1810" | Up ↑

|- id="2–12" style="text-align: center; background: #D8D8D8;"
| data-sort-value="001.9" colspan="2" | 2–12
| data-sort-value="ZZZZZ1811" colspan="5" |

| data-sort-value="1810-12-31" | 1811
| data-sort-value="ZZZZZ1811" | Up ↑

|- id="13–37" style="text-align: center; background: #D8D8D8;"
| data-sort-value="012.9" colspan="2" | 13–37
| data-sort-value="ZZZZZ1812" colspan="5" |

| data-sort-value="1811-12-31" | 1812
| data-sort-value="ZZZZZ1812" | Up ↑

|- id="37A–91" style="text-align: center; background: #D8D8D8;"
| data-sort-value="037.09" colspan="2" | 37A–91
| data-sort-value="ZZZZZ1813" colspan="5" |

| data-sort-value="1812-12-31" | 1813
| data-sort-value="ZZZZZ1813" | Up ↑

|- id="92–126" style="text-align: center; background: #D8D8D8;"
| data-sort-value="091.9" colspan="2" | 92–126
| data-sort-value="ZZZZZ1814" colspan="5" |

| data-sort-value="1813-12-31" | 1814
| data-sort-value="ZZZZZ1814" | Up ↑

|- id="127–330" style="text-align: center; background: #D8D8D8;"
| data-sort-value="126.9" colspan="2" | 127–330
| data-sort-value="ZZZZZ1815" colspan="5" |

| data-sort-value="1814-12-31" | 1815
| data-sort-value="ZZZZZ1815" | Up ↑

|- id="331–510" style="text-align: center; background: #D8D8D8;"
| data-sort-value="330.9" colspan="2" | 331–510
| data-sort-value="ZZZZZ1816" colspan="5" |

| data-sort-value="1815-12-31" | 1816
| data-sort-value="ZZZZZ1816" | Up ↑

|- id="511–598" style="text-align: center; background: #D8D8D8;"
| data-sort-value="510Z" colspan="2" | 511–598
| data-sort-value="ZZZZZ1817" colspan="5" |

| data-sort-value="1816-12-31" | 1817
| data-sort-value="ZZZZZ1817" | Up ↑

|- id="599–632" style="text-align: center; background: #D8D8D8;"
| data-sort-value="598Z" colspan="2" | 599–632
| data-sort-value="ZZZZZ1818" colspan="5" |

| data-sort-value="1817-12-31" | 1818
| data-sort-value="ZZZZZ1818" | Up ↑

|- id="633–678" style="text-align: center; background: #D8D8D8;"
| data-sort-value="632Z" colspan="2" | 633–678
| data-sort-value="ZZZZZ1819" colspan="5" |

| data-sort-value="1818-12-31" | 1819
| data-sort-value="ZZZZZ1819" | Up ↑

|- id="679–708" style="text-align: center; background: #D8D8D8;"
| data-sort-value="678Z" colspan="2" | 679–708
| data-sort-value="ZZZZZ1820" colspan="5" |

| data-sort-value="1819-12-31" | 1820
| data-sort-value="ZZZZZ1820" | Up ↑

|- id="708A–732" style="text-align: center; background: #D8D8D8;"
| data-sort-value="708A" colspan="2" | 708A–732
| data-sort-value="ZZZZZ1821" colspan="5" |

| data-sort-value="1820-12-31" | 1821
| data-sort-value="ZZZZZ1821" | Up ↑

|- id="733–767" style="text-align: center; background: #D8D8D8;"
| data-sort-value="732Z" colspan="2" | 733–767
| data-sort-value="ZZZZZ1822" colspan="5" |

| data-sort-value="1821-12-31" | 1822
| data-sort-value="ZZZZZ1822" | Up ↑

|- id="768–798" style="text-align: center; background: #D8D8D8;"
| data-sort-value="767Z" colspan="2" | 768–798
| data-sort-value="ZZZZZ1823" colspan="5" |

| data-sort-value="1822-12-31" | 1823
| data-sort-value="ZZZZZ1823" | Up ↑

|- id="799–822" style="text-align: center; background: #D8D8D8;"
| data-sort-value="798Z" colspan="2" | 799–822
| data-sort-value="ZZZZZ1824" colspan="5" |

| data-sort-value="1823-12-31" | 1824
| data-sort-value="ZZZZZ1824" | Up ↑

|- id="823–862" style="text-align: center; background: #D8D8D8;"
| data-sort-value="822Z" colspan="2" | 823–862
| data-sort-value="ZZZZZ1825" colspan="5" |

| data-sort-value="1824-12-31" | 1825
| data-sort-value="ZZZZZ1825" | Up ↑

|- id="863–895" style="text-align: center; background: #D8D8D8;"
| data-sort-value="862Z" colspan="2" | 863–895
| data-sort-value="ZZZZZ1826" colspan="5" |

| data-sort-value="1825-12-31" | 1826
| data-sort-value="ZZZZZ1826" | Up ↑

|- id="896–936" style="text-align: center; background: #D8D8D8;"
| data-sort-value="895Z" colspan="2" | 896–936
| data-sort-value="ZZZZZ1827" colspan="5" |

| data-sort-value="1826-12-31" | 1827
| data-sort-value="ZZZZZ1827" | Up ↑

|- id="936A–965B" style="text-align: center; background: #D8D8D8;"
| data-sort-value="936.09" colspan="2" | 936A–965B
| data-sort-value="ZZZZZ1828" colspan="5" |

| data-sort-value="1827-12-31" | 1828
| data-sort-value="ZZZZZ1828" | Up ↑

|- id="966–992" style="text-align: center; background: #D8D8D8;"
| data-sort-value="965Z" colspan="2" | 966–992
| data-sort-value="ZZZZZ1829" colspan="5" |

| data-sort-value="1828-11-18" | 1810–1828
| data-sort-value="ZZZZZ1829" | Up ↑

|- id="Anh. I" style="text-align: center; background: #D8D8D8;"
| data-sort-value="999.1" colspan="2" | Anh. I
| data-sort-value="ZZZZZ1831" colspan="5" | Spurious and doubtful works
| data-sort-value="1830-12-31" |

| data-sort-value="ZZZZZ1831" | Up ↑

|- id="Anh. II" style="text-align: center; background: #D8D8D8;"
| data-sort-value="999.2" colspan="2" | Anh. II
| data-sort-value="ZZZZZ1832" colspan="5" | Schubert's arrangements
| data-sort-value="1831-12-31" |

| data-sort-value="ZZZZZ1832" | Up ↑

|- id="Anh. III" style="text-align: center; background: #D8D8D8;"
| data-sort-value="999.3" colspan="2" | Anh. III
| data-sort-value="ZZZZZ1833" colspan="5" | Schubert's copies of compositions by other composers
| data-sort-value="1832-12-31" |

| data-sort-value="ZZZZZ1833" | Up ↑

|}

Not in the Deutsch catalogue
The New Schubert Edition mentions several compositions without a Deutsch number (D deest), most of them lost or fragmentary:
 "Seliges Genügen", on a text by Johanna Claudine von Ziglowski (date unknown, lost)
 Song, fragment for voice and piano (lost)
 Fragment without text for vocal soloists, choir and orchestra (date unknown)
 "doch stärker ist die Mutterliebe", fragment for voice and orchestra (date unknown, lost)
 Overture for orchestra (date unknown, lost)
 String Quartet in B-flat major (1816, lost)
 Fantasy for string quartet (1813, lost)
 String Sextet, fragment for three violins, viola, cello and double bass (date unknown, lost)
 Fugue for piano duet (1813, lost)
 "Lieder für das Pianoforte": songs for voice and/or piano (unknown date, lost)
 Minuet for piano? (1813?, sketch)
 Canon a trè: fragment of a canon for three voices (1816?)
 Canon in C major for five voices (1826?)
 Three 2-part imitation exercises in invertible counterpoint (1828)

External links

  Franz Schubert (1797-1828): Werke sortiert nach D (Deutsch-Verzeichnis, 1951) at 
  Franz Schubert: Catalogue des oeuvres at 
  Franz SCHUBERT: Catalogo delle composizioni at